Samson Mason (July 24, 1793 – February 1, 1869) was a U.S. Representative from Ohio.

Born in Fort Ann, Washington County, New York, Mason attended the common schools in Onondaga, New York.
He studied law.
He was admitted to the bar and practiced in Springfield, Ohio.
He served as prosecuting attorney of Clark County in 1822.
He served as a member of the State Senate 1829-1831.
He served as president judge of the court of common pleas in 1834.

Mason was elected as an Anti-Jacksonian to the Twenty-fourth Congress and reelected as a Whig to the three succeeding Congresses (March 4, 1835 – March 3, 1843).
He served as chairman of the Committee on Revisal and Unfinished Business (Twenty-fifth Congress).
He was not a candidate for renomination.
Mason was a Presidential elector in 1844 for Clay/Frelinghuysen.
He served as a member of the state house of representatives in 1845 and 1846.
United States Attorney for Ohio 1850-1853.
He served as a delegate to the Ohio constitutional convention in 1850.
He served in the state senate 1862-1864.
He served from captain to major general in the state militia.
He died in Springfield, Ohio, February 1, 1869.
He was interred in Ferncliff Cemetery.

Sources

1793 births
1869 deaths
Politicians from Springfield, Ohio
Ohio National Republicans
Ohio Constitutional Convention (1850)
1844 United States presidential electors
Ohio lawyers
Ohio state senators
Members of the Ohio House of Representatives
United States Attorneys for the District of Ohio
American militia generals
National Republican Party members of the United States House of Representatives
Whig Party members of the United States House of Representatives from Ohio
19th-century American politicians
People from Onondaga, New York
People from Fort Ann, New York
19th-century American lawyers